The Apostolic Vicariate (or Vicariate Apostolic) of Northern Arabia is a Catholic apostolic vicariate  with official seat in Bahrain.

Its cathedral episcopal see is the Our Lady of Arabia Cathedral, in Bahrain. 

The first apostolic vicar of the vicariate was the Italian bishop Camillo Ballin, a member of the Comboni Missionaries, who died on April 12, 2020. The vicariate was then led by an Apostolic Administrator,  Bishop Paul Hinder OFM Cap, who is also the Emeritus Apostolic Vicar of Southern Arabia.

On 28 January 2023, Pope Francis appointed Msgr. Aldo Berardi O.SS.T. as the Vicar Apostolic of Northern Arabia.

Statistics 
The vicariate serves the peninsular Arabian countries of Bahrain, Kuwait, Qatar, and Saudi Arabia, but there are no churches on Saudi territory. As of 2020, it serves a Catholic population of 2,722,000, which is approximately 6.3% of the total population of the region (43,463,583). 

The vicariate comprises 11 parishes and has 54 priests, including 11 diocesan and 43 religious priests. Additionally, there are 1 deacon, 44 brothers, 18 sisters,1 seminarian, and 61 lay religious who support the vicariate..

History 
The Apostolic Vicariate was established as the Apostolic Prefecture of Kuwait on  June 1953, on territory split off from the then Apostolic Vicariate of Arabia. It was promoted on  02 December 1954, as the Apostolic Vicariate of Kuwait, entitled to a titular bishop. It was renamed the Apostolic Vicariate of Northern Arabia on 31 May 2011, having gained additional territory from the Apostolic Vicariate of Arabia, which was renamed the Apostolic Vicariate of Southern Arabia. 

In January 2011, Pope Benedict XVI through the Congregation for Divine Worship and the Discipline of the Sacraments declared the Blessed Virgin Mary under the title Our Lady of Arabia patroness of the Northern Vicariate (feast on the 2nd Sunday of Ordinary Time).

In August 2012, the headquarters of the vicariate was transferred from Kuwait to Bahrain, which is in the centre of the vicariate and had a more permissive visa policy.

Leadership 
Apostolic Prefect of Kuwait
 Ubaldo Teofano Stella, Discalced Carmelites  (O.C.D.) (29 June 1953 – 2 December 1954 see below)

Apostolic Vicars of Kuwait
 Ubaldo Teofano Stella, O.C.D. (born Italy) (see above 2 December 1954 – retired March 1966), Titular Bishop of Antæopolis (1955.06.04 – death 1978.11.09)
 Victor León Esteban San Miguel y Erce, O.C.D. (born Spain) (31 May 1976 – retired 5 November 1981), Titular Bishop of Rusubbicari (1976.05.31 – death 1995.04.04); initially as Apostolic Administrator 1966.03.17 – 1976.05.31
 Francis George Adeodatus Micallef, O.C.D. (born Malta) (5 November 1981 – retired 14 July 2005), Titular Bishop of Tinisa in Proconsulari (1981.11.05 – death 2018.01.03) 
 Camillo Ballin, Combonian Missionaries of the Heart of Jesus (M.CC.I.) (born Italy) (14 July 2005 – 31 May 2011 see below), Titular Bishop of Arna (2005.07.14 – 2011.05.31)

Apostolic Vicars of Northern Arabia
Camillo Ballin, M.C.C.I. (see above 31 May 2011 – death 12 April 2020)
Aldo Berardi, Trintarian (O.SS.T.) (born France) (Apostolic Vicar Elect), 

Apostolic Administrators

 Victor León Esteban San Miguel y Erce OCD (born Spain) (see above 1966.03.17 – 1976.05.31) Paul Hinder, OFM Cap (born Switzerland) (13 May 2020 – present) Titular Bishop of Macon, Emeritus'' Apostolic Vicar of Southern Arabia

Parishes 
 Kuwait:                                      
Holy Family Co - Cathedral , in Kuwait City; 

St. Thérèse Parish, in Salmiya; 

Our Lady of Arabia Parish, in Ahmadi; 

St. Daniel Comboni Parish, in Jleeb Al-Shuyoukh  

 Bahrain:
Sacred Heart Church, Manama

Parish of St. Arethas

Parish of Our Lady of Arabia

Parish of Our Lady of Fatima

Parish of St. Joseph

Awali mission

 Qatar:
Parish of Our Lady of the Rosary

St. Thomas Church, Doha

Coat of arms 
The proposal of coat of arms created by Marek Sobola, a heraldic artist from Slovakia. The colors of the new coat of arms are derived from the national colors of the states, which are incorporated into the Vicariate – Bahrain (red), Kuwait (black), Qatar (violet) and Saudi Arabia (green). The letter "M" is the symbol of the Blessed Virgin Mary under the title Our Lady of Arabia as patron saint of the Northern Vicariate.

See also 

 Apostolic Vicariate of Southern Arabia
 List of Catholic dioceses in Northern Arabia
 Catholic Church in Bahrain
 Catholic Church in Kuwait
 Catholic Church in Saudi Arabia
 Catholic Church in Qatar

References

External links 
 GCatholic.org, with Google map & – satellite photo; data for most sections
 Vicariate Apostolic of Northern Arabia official website
 Catholic Hierarchy.org entry 

Northern Arabia
Northern Arabia
Northern Arabia
Christianity in Saudi Arabia
Catholic Church in Bahrain
Catholic Church in Qatar
Catholic Church in Saudi Arabia
Apostolic Vicariate
Christian organizations established in 1953
Northern Arabia
1953 establishments in Kuwait
Apostolic Vicariate of Northern Arabia
Apostolic Vicariate of Arabia
Catholic Church in the Arabian Peninsula